Théodore Pilette (8 September 1883 in St. Gilles, Belgium – 3 May 1921 in Capellen, Luxembourg) was a Belgian racecar driver.
Father of André Pilette and grandfather of Teddy Pilette, Théodore was the first member of that racing dynasty. He started racing in 1903, and was the first Belgian to race at the Indianapolis 500 in 1913 with his works Mercedes-Knight car. Despite having the smallest engine, it took fifth place, averaging 68.148 mph (109.674 km/h) over the 500 miles (800 km).

Théodore was the importer in Belgium for Bugatti and Mercedes. His concession, Etablissements Pilette, was located Rue Veydt in Brussels.

Théodore died on his way back from the Mercedes factory in a road accident near Capellen with his mechanic, Bruyère.

Indianapolis 500 results

References

1883 births
1921 deaths
Belgian racing drivers
Indianapolis 500 drivers